Madurankuli, also abbreviated MDK, is a city that is located between Puttalam and Chilaw in North Western Province, Sri Lanka. The city is connected by roads and a railway network, . It is one of the oldest residential parts of the city, containing over 3,000 people.

Madurankuli is a growing commercial and agricultural area that is known for trading activities, agriculture and exports of coconuts, copra, salts, oil, prawns and vegetables.

Climate 

The climate of Madurankuli is tropical with a marked dry season and temperatures averaging between 26 °C in January to 30 °C in April and May. Rainfall averages around 2,000 mm per year.

Businesses 

The major businesses in Madurankuli are coconuts, fibres, charcoal, agriculture, shrimp farms, oil and copra. Many businesses here are traded and marketed in international markets so the export rate is higher than other cities.

Businesses on the coast specialise in fishing, and is where hotels and restaurants are located.

Religion 

Madurankuli is populated by Buddhists, Muslims and Hindus. Most of the Buddhist temples (Viharayas) were built by ancient kings and they identified as "Raja Maha Viharayas" and are under the custody of the Department of Archaeology, Sri Lanka.

Festivals and specials
The people in Madurankuli celebrate many traditional festivals. All Buddhist temples celebrate Vesak, Poson and Esela festivals. In May and June, temples organise offering campaigns known as "Dansala" for visitors and residents with the support of locals in the area. These festivals feature colorful decorations, lanterns, illuminations and pageants where traditional dancing, drumming, costumed dignitaries and elephants are paraded.
 St Anne's Roman Catholic church is located near the beach in Talawila in Puttalam district. Thousands of pilgrims attend the church for its main festivals in March and July.
 Ramazan, Haj and Milad-un-Nabi are celebrated by the majority of Muslims in Madurankuliya.
 The Munneswaram and Hindu temples are pilgrim centres of many devotees. The main temple of god Shiva at Munneswaram comprises the shrines. Munneswaram celebrates its major festival in August where fire walking is practiced.

Culture and traditions 

Culture in Madurankuliya is similar to other cities in North Western Province. Cultural aspects are mostly derived from the Muslim tradition.

Transport 

The nearest airport is Bandaranaike International Airport.

Trains are serviced by the Muthu Kumari (Pearl Princess) train.

The region is served by an extensive rail and road transport system providing linkages to the major cities and ports in Sri Lanka. It has an extensive public transport system based on buses operated both by private operators and the government owned Sri Lanka Transport Board (SLTB).

Towns in Puttalam District